Bethesda Regional Health Centre, formerly Bethesda Hospital, is a hospital in Steinbach, Manitoba, one of seventeen hospitals operated by the Southern Health - Santé Sud Regional Health Authority. Bethesda is the largest hospital in the Eastman region. The hospital, which first opened in 1929, underwent a $22 million upgrade to the ER in 2012. The expansion was necessitated by the rapid population growth in the city of Steinbach and area.

References

Hospitals in Manitoba
Steinbach, Manitoba